The voiceless labiodental affricate ( in IPA) is a rare affricate consonant that is initiated as a labiodental stop  and released as a voiceless labiodental fricative . 

The XiNkuna dialect of Tsonga has this affricate, as in  "hippopotamuses" and aspirated  "distance" (compare  "tortoise", which shows that the stop is not epenthetic), as well as a voiced labiodental affricate, as in  "chin". There is no voiceless labiodental fricative  in this dialect of Tsonga, only a voiceless bilabial fricative, as in  "finished". (Among voiced fricatives, both  and  occur, however.)

German has a similar sound  in Pfeffer  ('pepper') and Apfel  ('apple'). It differs from a true labiodental affricate in that it starts out bilabial but then the lower lip retracts slightly for the frication.

The sound occurs occasionally in English, in words where one syllable ends with "p" and the next starts with "f", like in "helpful" or "stepfather".

Features 
Features of the voiceless labiodental affricate:

There are two variants of the stop component:
bilabial, which means it is articulated with both lips. The affricate with this stop component is called bilabial-labiodental.
labiodental, which means it is articulated with the lower lip and the upper teeth.
The fricative component of this affricate is labiodental, articulated with the lower lip and the upper teeth.

Occurrence

Notes

References

External links
 

Affricates
Pulmonic consonants
Voiceless oral consonants
Labiodental consonants
Central consonants